Bulusu Lakshmana Deekshatulu (born 31 October 1936, India) is an Indian academic who has made important contributions to Digital Image Processing and Control Theory. He is a Fellow of The World Academy of Sciences, Fellow of Indian National Science Academy, The National Academy of Sciences, India, Indian Academy of Sciences, Indian National Academy of Engineering, National Academy of Agricultural Sciences, and IEEE.

He was a recipient of Padma Shri conferred by the Government of India. He worked at the Indian Institute of Science as a Professor, National Remote Sensing Centre of Indian Space Research Organisation as a Director and Distinguished Scientist. He also worked as a Director, Centre for Space Science Technology Education in Asia & the Pacific - affiliated to UN-Dehradun as a Founding Director. He was the Chairman Board Governing Council of National Institute of Technology, Warangal.

He is currently the Chairman of Jawaharlal Nehru Technological University, College of Engineering, Hyderabad. He is also a Distinguished Fellow at the Institute for Development and Research in Banking Technology, Hyderabad.

Education
Bachelor of Science in Engineering, Banaras Hindu University
Master in Engineering (Electrical Engineering), Indian Institute of Science
PhD, Indian Institute of Science

Research
He has contributed in the fields of Digital Image Processing, Remote Sensing, Control Systems, Artificial intelligence, Computer science, Computer vision, Machine learning, Game theory, Power systems, Pattern recognition, Neural networks. He designed and fabricated for the first time in India, gray scale and color drum scanners for computer picture processing that has won him NRDC Award.

Professional
Bulusu served as
Chairman of Remote Sensing Applications Missions India 1987–1995.
UN/FAO Consultant in 1981 & Senior Consultant in 1996 in Beijing
Government representative in the UN/ESCAP/RSSP
Visiting Scientist, IBM Thomas J. Watson Research Centre, York Town Heights, New York
Visiting Scientist, Environmental Research Institute, Michigan, 1971–72
Distinguished Fellow, IDRBT Hyderabad
Chairman, Board of Governors (BoG), College of Engineering JNTUH, Hyderabad
Govt. representative in Directors' Meetings & Inter Governmental Consultative Committee meetings from 1985–95
Chairman, Indian Geosphere & Biosphere Programme (IGBP)
Visiting Professor, School of Computer & Information Sciences, University of Hyderabad, 2002–2010

Awards, honors, and fellowships
Fellow IEEE
Fellow of The Third World Academy of Sciences, Italy
Distinguished Fellow IETE
Distinguished Fellow of Astronautical Society of India
Hon. Member Asian Association for Remote Sensing
Fellow of Indian National Science Academy
Fellow of Indian Academy of Sciences
Fellow of Indian National Academy of Engineering
Fellow of The National Academy of Sciences, India
Fellow of National Academy of Agricultural Sciences
Fellow of Computer Society of India
Fellow of Indian Meteorological Society of India
Fellow of Indian Geophysical Union, Hyderabad
Fellow of Association of Exploration Geo-Physicis
Fellow of Indian Society of Remote Sensing(ISRS)
Fellow of Indian National Cartographic Association
Fellow of Aeronautical Society of India
Member of Indian Physics Association
Best PhD thesis "Martin Foster" Medal by IISc, 1964
Bhaskara Award by ISRS India
"Bharat Ratna Sir M. Visveswaraya Award" for 'Outstanding Engineer' in 1984
NRDC Invention Awards in January 1986 and in August 1993
Dr. Biren Roy Space Science Award in 1988
Padma Shri in January 1991
Brahm Prakash Medal for significant contributions to Engineering Technology
Om Prakash Bhasin Award for Science and Technology for 1995
Sivananda Eminent Citizen Award in December 1998
Boon Indrambarya Gold Medal by Thailand Remote Sensing and GIS Association in November 1999
Aryabhatta Award by Astronautical Society of India
Distinguished Alumni Award from IISc in 2006
IEEE third Millennium Medal, 2000
Asthana Vidwan Award by DUTTA Peetham, Mysore, 2010
National Award for Ocean Science & Technology, MoES, Govt of India 2011
Chen Shupeng Award from CCNRS & AARS, in Taipei in 2011
Life Time Contribution Award from ACRS, Beijing in October 2009
Life Time Achievement Award-2014 from IETE
Life Time Achievement Award-2014 from Systems Society of India
Life Time Achievement Award-2015 from INAE
ISRO Outstanding Achievement Award-2012 from the Indian Space Research Organization

References

1936 births
Living people
Banaras Hindu University alumni
Fellows of the Indian Academy of Sciences
Fellows of the Indian National Science Academy
Scientists from Odisha
Fellows of the Indian Geophysical Union
Academic staff of the Indian Institute of Science
Indian computer scientists
Indian Space Research Organisation people
Fellow Members of the IEEE
Telugu people
Recipients of the Padma Shri in science & engineering